Marc Perrin de Brichambaut (born 29 October 1948) is a French career judge and diplomat. On 10 December 2014 he was elected a judge to the International Criminal Court (ICC) in The Hague. Until 30 June 2011 he was the Secretary General of the Organization for Security and Co-operation in Europe.

Early life and education
Marc Perrin de Brichambaut was born in Rabat, Morocco. He graduated from France's École nationale d'administration in Paris in 1974.

Career
De Brichambaut joined the Council of State, France's supreme court for judicial review, in 1974. 

In 1983 and 1984, de Brichambaut was chief of staff to Roland Dumas, then Minister of European Affairs, and after Dumas became Minister of Foreign Affairs, de Brichambaut continued to serve as his chief of staff.

In 1986, he moved to Washington, D.C., where he worked as cultural Counsellor for the French Embassy, returning to Paris in 1988 as Principal Adviser to Defense Minister Jean-Pierre Chevenement. He was also adviser to French Foreign Minister Claude Cheysson.

From 1991 to 1994, de Brichambaut was the head of French Delegation at the Conference on Security and Co-operation in Europe (later (OSCE) in Vienna. He was appointed Conseiller d'Etat in 1992. 

From 1994 to 1998, de Brichambaut headed the French Foreign Ministry's Legal Division. In that capacity, he led the French delegation to the Rome Conference and signed the Rome Statute of the International Criminal Court on behalf of his country.

Before being appointed as OSCE Secretary General he was Director for Strategic Affairs at the Ministry of the Armed Forces. He served as Secretary General of the OSCE in Vienna from 2005 to 2011.

Judge at the International Criminal Court
On 10 December 2014 de Brichambaut was elected a judge to the International Criminal Court (ICC) in The Hague. In his capacity as presiding judge of Trial Chamber VII in 2016, he convicted former vice-president of the Democratic Republic of the Congo Jean-Pierre Bemba and four members of his legal team of interfering with witnesses; the verdicts marked the first time the court found suspects guilty of attempting to pervert the course of justice. As presiding judge of Trial Chamber II, he issued a landmark ruling in 2017 by finding former Congolese militia leader Germain Katanga liable for $1 million in damages to his victims; this was the first time the court ordered a convict to pay damages to individual victims. Shortly after, he also found Thomas Lubanga liable for compensation of $10 million to 425 former child soldiers. 

In a high-profile decision on South Africa’s failure to arrest and surrender President Omar Al-Bashir of Sudan to the Court while he was on its territory, de Brichambaut issued a separate opinion in 2017 and held that both countries were obliged to arrest Bashir because they had both signed the Genocide Convention.

In March 2018, the ICC judges elected de Brichambaut as Second Vice-President for a three-year term.

References

External links
 International Criminal Court
 Secretary General Official site
 OSCE Official site

1948 births
Living people
French politicians
École nationale d'administration alumni
Organization for Security and Co-operation in Europe
French officials of the United Nations
21st-century French judges
International Criminal Court judges
French judges of international courts and tribunals
OSCE Secretaries General